A list of films produced in France in 1959.

See also
 1959 in France
 1959 in French television

Notes

External links
 French films of 1959 at the Internet Movie Database
French films of 1959 at Cinema-francais.fr

1959
Films
Lists of 1959 films by country or language